Atlanta Rhythm Section discography consists of 13 studio albums, six compilation albums, two live albums, and 15 singles.

Albums

Studio albums

Live albums

Compilation albums

Singles

Video
Live at Stabler Arena (2005)
Champagne Jam Live (2007)

References

External links
 
 Entry at 45cat.com

Discography
Discographies of American artists
Rock music group discographies